The Nicaragua Davis Cup team represents Nicaragua in Davis Cup tennis competition and are governed by the Federación Nicaragüense de Tenis. They currently compete in the Americas Zone of Group IV.

History
Nicaragua competed in its first Davis Cup in 2022.

Players

Recent performances
Here is the list of all match-ups of Nicaragua participation in the Davis Cup in 2022.

See also
Davis Cup

References

External links

Davis Cup teams
Davis Cup
Davis Cup